The Magic Keyboard may refer to:

 Magic Keyboard (Mac), a wireless keyboard released by Apple in 2015
 Magic Keyboard for iPad, a wireless keyboard with an integrated trackpad for use in iPads with a Smart Connector, released in 2020
 The built-in keyboard of the MacBook Pro since 2019 and MacBook Air since 2020